In calculus, Rolle's theorem or Rolle's lemma essentially states that any real-valued differentiable function that attains equal values at two distinct points must have at least one stationary point somewhere between them—that is, a point where the first derivative (the slope of the tangent line to the graph of the function) is zero. The theorem is named after Michel Rolle.

Standard version of the theorem 

This version of Rolle's theorem is used to prove the mean value theorem, of which Rolle's theorem is indeed a special case. It is also the basis for the proof of Taylor's theorem.

History 
Although the theorem is named after Michel Rolle, Rolle's 1691 proof covered only the case of polynomial functions. His proof did not use the methods of differential calculus, which at that point in his life he considered to be fallacious. The theorem was first proved by Cauchy in 1823 as a corollary of a proof of the mean value theorem. The name "Rolle's theorem" was first used by Moritz Wilhelm Drobisch of Germany in 1834 and by Giusto Bellavitis of Italy in 1846.

Examples

First example

For a radius , consider the function

Its graph is the upper semicircle centered at the origin. Note that the theorem applies even when the function cannot be differentiated at the endpoints because it only requires the function to be differentiable in the open interval.

Second example

If differentiability fails at an interior point of the interval, the conclusion of Rolle's theorem may not hold. Consider the absolute value function

The theorem cannot be applied to this function because it does not satisfy the condition that the function must be differentiable for every  in the open interval. However, when the differentiability requirement is dropped from Rolle's theorem,  will still have a critical number in the open interval , but it may not yield a horizontal tangent (as in the case of the absolute value represented in the graph).

Generalization 

The second example illustrates the following generalization of Rolle's theorem:

If for every  in the open interval  the right-hand limit

and the left-hand limit

exist in the extended real line , then there is some number  in the open interval  such that one of the two limits

Remarks
If  is convex or concave, then the right- and left-hand derivatives exist at every inner point, hence the above limits exist and are real numbers.
This generalized version of the theorem is sufficient to prove convexity when the one-sided derivatives are monotonically increasing:

Proof of the generalized version 

Since the proof for the standard version of Rolle's theorem and the generalization are very similar, we prove the generalization.

We shall examine the above right- and left-hand limits separately.

Therefore, for every ,

hence

where the limit exists by assumption, it may be minus infinity.

Similarly, for every , the inequality turns around because the denominator is now negative and we get

hence

where the limit might be plus infinity.

(Alternatively, we can apply Fermat's stationary point theorem directly.)

Generalization to higher derivatives 

We can also generalize Rolle's theorem by requiring that  has more points with equal values and greater regularity.  Specifically, suppose that
 the function  is  times continuously differentiable on the closed interval  and the th derivative exists on the open interval , and

Particularly, this version of the theorem asserts that if a function differentiable enough times has  roots (so they have the same value, that is 0), then there is an internal point where  vanishes.

Proof
The proof uses mathematical induction. The case  is simply the standard version of Rolle's theorem. Assume the function  satisfies the hypotheses of the theorem. Hence, the first derivative satisfies the assumptions on the  closed intervals .

Generalizations to other fields 
Rolle's theorem is a property of differentiable functions over the real numbers, which are an ordered field. As such, it does not generalize to other fields, but the following corollary does: if a real polynomial factors (has all of its roots) over the real numbers, then its derivative does as well. One may call this property of a field Rolle's property. More general fields do not always have differentiable functions, but they do always have polynomials, which can be symbolically differentiated. Similarly, more general fields may not have an order, but one has a notion of a root of a polynomial lying in a field.

Thus Rolle's theorem shows that the real numbers have Rolle's property.  Any algebraically closed field such as the complex numbers has Rolle's property. However, the rational numbers do not – for example,  factors over the rationals, but its derivative,

does not. For finite fields, the answer is that only  and  have Rolle's property.

For a complex version, see Voorhoeve index.

See also 
Mean value theorem
Intermediate value theorem
Linear interpolation
Gauss–Lucas theorem

References

Further reading

External links 
 
 Rolle's and Mean Value Theorems at cut-the-knot.
 Mizar system proof: http://mizar.org/version/current/html/rolle.html#T2

Theorems in real analysis
Articles containing proofs
Theorems in calculus